Robert Kinelski (born January 27, 1981) is an American mixing engineer, engineer, and record producer. He is best known for his engineering and mixing work for Billie Eilish, Finneas, Lil Dicky, Big Sean, Karol G, Joji, Beyoncé, and more. In 2020, Rob won four Grammy Awards, including Record of the Year, Album of the Year, Best Pop Vocal Album, and Best Engineered Album, Non-Classical for mixing Billie Eilish's debut album When We All Fall Asleep, Where Do We Go?.

Early life and education
Kinelski was born in Staten Island, New York. At a young age, his family  relocated  to nearby Howell Township, New Jersey. Kinelski graduated from Howell High School and the SAE Institute in Manhattan.

Career
Kinelski  started his career at Sony Studios New York, engineering for Swizz Beatz, LL Cool J, and Ryan Leslie, amongst others, notably working on Beyoncé's GRAMMY-winning album B'Day.

After relocating to Los Angeles in 2009, Rob would collaborate with No I.D., J. Cole, Rihanna, Nas, Common, Vince Staples, Jhené Aiko, and Big Sean, and more as a member of the Cocaine 80s music collective. Beginning in 2018, Rob has worked very closely with Billie Eilish and Finneas O'Connell, mixing a majority of their discography through the present.

Mixing discography

Awards and nominations

References

External links
 
 

American audio engineers
Living people
Grammy Award winners
1981 births
Cocaine 80s members
Howell High School (New Jersey) alumni
People from Howell Township, New Jersey
People from Staten Island